Hoogeveen is a railway station located in Hoogeveen, Netherlands. The station was opened on 1 May 1870 and is located on the Meppel–Groningen railway. Train services are operated by Nederlandse Spoorwegen.

Train services

Bus services

External links
NS website 
Dutch Public Transport journey planner

See also
 List of railway stations in Drenthe

Railway stations in Drenthe
Railway stations opened in 1870
Railway stations on the Staatslijn C
Hoogeveen